Styropian – reedycja is the new version of Pidzama Porno's album, previously released in 1998. Remastered and issued by SP Records, it contains bonus tracks and a video clip to "Do nieba wzieci". The band used the original magnetic tapes from the studio to recreate the sound from the start. The result is similar to an ear wash – more details can be heard. The sound was only modified, nothing new was added.

Track listing

Videos

Personnel
Krzysztof "Grabaż" Grabowski – vocals 
Andrzej "Kozak" Kozakiewicz – guitar, vocals 
Sławek "Dziadek" Mizerkiewicz – guitar, chords
Rafał "Kuzyn" Piotrowiak – drums 
Julian "Julo" Piotrowiak – bass guitar

and also:

Marcin Świetlicki – the voice in "Gloria"
Sowa – flute 
Adaś z Jafii N. – keyboard
Maciek Szpalik – akordeon 
Dusiołek – bass guitar 
Jacek K.: clapping

orchestra:

Rafał Wiśniewski – trumpet 
Maciej Kociński – medium sax 
Maciej Kołodziejski – trombone
and the Marx Brothers

References

External links
 https://web.archive.org/web/20110723120533/http://www.terazrock.pl/cd.php?CdId=709 
 http://www.pidzamaporno.art.pl/?p=new_view&id=239

Pidżama Porno albums
2009 albums